Polly Alexandra Walker (born 19 May 1966) is an English actress. She has starred in the films Enchanted April (1991), Patriot Games (1992), Sliver (1993), Restoration (1995), The Gambler (1997), and Savage Messiah (2002). In 2006, she received a Golden Globe Award nomination for her role in the drama series Rome (2005–2007). She is also known for her roles in BBC One dramas Prisoners’ Wives (2012–2013), Line of Duty (2016, 2019) and Netflix Original period drama Bridgerton (2020).

Early life 
Walker was born in Warrington, Lancashire. She attended Padgate 
Church of England Primary School in Warrington and Bush Davies School of Ballet and Performing Arts in East Grinstead until joining Ballet Rambert School at 16.  She had to abandon dancing after a leg injury at the age of 18. She then decided to become an actress. She attended Drama Centre London before working at the Royal Shakespeare Company, where she played small roles for six months before getting cast in small roles on television.

Career

Film and television 
Walker landed the title role in the television series Lorna Doone before making her feature debut in Shogun Mayeda (aka Journey of Honor) (1991). In that same year she appeared in Les Equilibristes and in Mike Newell's Enchanted April, in which she played an aristocrat eager to escape the attentions of her persistent male admirers. Walker first gained international attention in 1992 as a single-minded English member of an Irish terrorist group in Phillip Noyce's Patriot Games. In 2003 she had a starring role in the BBC drama series State of Play.

Between 2005 and 2007, Walker played Atia of the Julii in both seasons of the HBO–BBC2 television series Rome. Her performance earned her a Golden Globe nomination in 2005 for Best Performance by an Actress in a Television Series – Drama. She next played the sinister Catherine Braithwaite in "Deus Ex Machina", a two-episode story of the BBC television "cold case" crime series Waking the Dead, which also aired in January 2007. In May 2007, she appeared as Lady Bess Sedgwick in ITV's Marple: At Bertram's Hotel, and then played sugar heiress Ellis Samuels in the CBS television drama Cane, which premiered 25 September 2007.

In May 2008, Walker was cast as Sister Clarice Willow, headmistress of a private religious school, in Syfy's Battlestar Galactica prequel series Caprica. In 2011 she guest starred as Ranna Seneschal, leader of the underground city of Praxis, on Sanctuary.

In 2012, she starred in BBC's crime drama Prisoners' Wives as crime wife Francesca Miller. She returned to the role in 2013 for the second series.

In 2014, she had a recurring role as the character Delphine Day in the ITV series Mr Selfridge.

In 2015, she appeared in The Syndicate as DI Baker.

In 2018, she starred as Bel, the leading character in Age Before Beauty.

In 2020, she appeared as Lady Lunete, the Queen Regent and mother to Uther Pendragon, a recurring character for 5 episodes in the Netflix series, Cursed. Since December 2020, Walker has starred in the Netflix series Bridgerton as Lady Featherington.

Personal life 
On 23 October 2008, Walker married the former actor Laurence Penry-Jones (brother of Rupert Penry-Jones) with whom she lived in the United States for several years. In 2015, they returned to London.

Filmography

Film

Television

Video Games

References

External links 
 

1966 births
20th-century English actresses
21st-century English actresses
Alumni of the Drama Centre London
English film actresses
English stage actresses
English television actresses
Living people
Royal Shakespeare Company members
English Shakespearean actresses
Actresses from Warrington